Shasta is a rural locality (a village) in Pirinemskoye Rural Settlement of Pinezhsky District, Arkhangelsk Oblast, Russia. The population was 2 as of 2010.

Geography 
Shasta is located on the Pinega River, 48 km north of Karpogory (the district's administrative centre) by road. Veyegora is the nearest rural locality.

References 

Rural localities in Pinezhsky District